Initially formed as the Southport Football Club the Southport Tigers compete in both the junior and senior Gold Coast Rugby League competitions. The club is based at Owen Park in Southport, Queensland, Australia.

History
There has been a long history of Southport being represented in Rugby league dating back to the 1930s. They were then known as the Southport Wanderers. In 1931, the Southport Wanderers were the A Grade undefeated Premiers winning the Plunket Cup in that year. The Southport Wanderers Football Club A Grade side were the South Coast League Premiers and winners of the Mathias Cup in 1939. Southport also played local competition in the late forties and early fifties. The Southport Wanderers also had south coast representative teams in the Brisbane Rugby League Premiership competition.

In the late fifties the team was revived as the All Whites. The team was resurrected again in the sixties as the Gold Coast R.L.F.C. In 1966 they lost the grand final to Seagulls. In 1968 the Gold Coast Tigers won the grand final against the Seagulls and won the Caltex Cup the same year. Gold Coast Tigers beat Seagulls again in the grand final in 1972 and went on to win the grand final in 1976 and 1977.

In 1978 Gold Coast Tigers changed the name to the Southport Tigers to accommodate new Gold Coast clubs. Southport Tigers went on to win the grand final of the Gold Coast competition in 1980, 1981, 1986, 1987 and 1988.

Notable Juniors

Southport Tigers have produced some notable players:
Greg Eastwood
Bobby Cook
Lloyd Little
Norm McFadden
Lance Townsend
Ray McCarron
Steve Rogers
John Chisolm
Pat Kelly
Paul Wild
Paul Cahill
Errol Slingsby
Peter Inskip
Jay Hoffman
Clive Palmer
Pat Shepherdson
Keith Harris
Greg Beddow 
Richard Rice
Paul Garrett
Wayne Chisholm
David Boyd
Shaun Devine
Dean Scott
Jamahl Lolesi
Gary Roberts
Keith Hookway
Steve Bunney

Recent history

Their most successful A grade season was 2008, in which they won every match and beat Currumbin Eagles in the grand final. A win that not only saw the A Grade team win the Grand Final as undefeated Premiers but also backed it up with a Reserve Grade Premiership. 
In 2009,the reserves went undefeated the whole season beating Burleigh Bears 16-18 in the grand final. The A grade also had a good year defending their premiership after beating Bilambil Jets 12-6 in the grand final.

See also

List of rugby league clubs in Australia

References

Southport, Queensland
Rugby league teams on the Gold Coast, Queensland
Rugby clubs established in 1931
1931 establishments in Australia